Lac de Mondély is a lake in Ariège, France, home to mushrooms, migratory birds, as well as a number of species of fish including trout, gudgeon, and minnow.

References 

Lakes of Ariège (department)